Konokovo is a rural locality (a selo) in Uspensky District of Krasnodar Krai, Russia, located on the Kuban River. Population:

References

Rural localities in Krasnodar Krai